Gaurav Khatri (born 30 December 1991) is an Indian cricketer. He made his List A debut for Railways in the 2016–17 Vijay Hazare Trophy on 1 March 2017.

References

External links
 

1991 births
Living people
Indian cricketers
Railways cricketers
Place of birth missing (living people)